The Columbia Lions men's squash team is the intercollegiate men's squash team for Columbia University located in New York City, New York. The team competes in the Ivy League within the College Squash Association. The university first fielded a varsity team in 2010, under the leadership of head coach Jacques Swanepoel.

History 

The Lions beat Harvard in the 2017–2018 regular season for the first time in program history with a nail-biting 5–4 victory, with the deciding match won by Osama Khalifa. They went on undefeated in Ivy League play in the regular season, earning them their very first Ivy League title.
 2018 Ivy League Champion

Year-by-year results

Men's Squash 
Updated February 2022.

Players

Current roster 
Updated February 2022.

|}

Notable former players 
Notable alumni include:
 Ramit Tandon '15, Current world no. 56, 4x 1st-team All-American and 4x 1st-team All-Ivy, 4 PSA titles 
 Osama Khalifa '18, 4x 1st-team All-American and 4x 1st-team All-Ivy, 2017 College Individual National Champion, Winner of Skillman Award for best 4-year career in college squash

References

External links 
 

 
College men's squash teams in the United States
Squash in New York (state)
Sports clubs established in 2010
2010 establishments in New York City